The Nebraska State Patrol is Nebraska's only statewide full-service law enforcement agency. Serving Nebraska since 1937, State Patrol troopers perform a wide variety of duties. Those include working with communities to improve public safety, enforcing traffic laws and drug laws, investigating crimes, and enforcing the laws and regulations pertaining to motor carriers.

The current NSP Superintendent is Colonel John A. Bolduc.

NSP is divided into six districts including:

Headquarters in Lincoln
Troop A in Omaha
Troop B in Norfolk
Troop C in Grand Island
Troop D in North Platte
Troop E in Scottsbluff

Divisions
NSP has several divisions which operate within the department, they include:

The Aviation Support Division which consists of a Bell 407 helicopter, three Turbo Cessna T206H's equipped with FLIR and downlink capabilities, and a Piper Super Cub used for traffic enforcement, observation and surveillance.  The Aviation Support Division is used for many different functions including:  Drug raids, presidential security, rescue missions, investigative photography, transportation, surveillance, and traffic enforcement.
The State Capitol Security Division is responsible for the daily security needs of the "Capitol Complex Area". The State Capitol is equipped with over 60 cameras that are recorded using a "Digital Video Recorder" which allows them to store video images and print out still images.
The Carrier Enforcement division operates permanent truck scales throughout the state, conducts carrier inspections and is in charge of monitoring commercial motor vehicle accidents.
Communications - Statewide, 50 Communications Specialists staff the six communications centers located in Omaha, Lincoln, Norfolk, Grand Island, North Platte and Scottsbluff.
Community Policing
Executive Protection
Internal Affairs
Investigative Services
The K-9 Division consists of 15 troopers and their police service dogs. Each dog costs about $3,500-$5,000. The division relies heavily on public support. The dogs are purchased by the Nebraska State Patrol Foundation using donations from the public.
Legal
Supply and Radio Engineering
The Training Academy conducts both the Basic Recruit Camp and in service training.

Training academy

NSP runs their own 24-week in-resident training academy in lieu of sending recruits through the standard Nebraska Law Enforcement Training Center's 13-week course.

The new Nebraska State Patrol Training Academy is co-located with the Nebraska Law Enforcement Training Center in Grand Island, Nebraska.  The collocation of agencies upgraded the facilities for virtually every officer completing law enforcement certification in the State of Nebraska. The Training Academy includes: barracks to house up to 208 officers, modern classrooms, a defensive tactics room, a fitness room, a training tank, a gymnasium, a recreation area, 2 ranges (1 static shooting, 1 combat), an inspection bay and training room for commercial vehicle inspections, a police service dog training grounds/boarding area, a driving range, and a cafeteria.

The State Patrol's style of instruction balances a para-military environment with an academic environment. The curriculum includes instruction in officer survival, investigations, patrolling, legal, administrative, tactical, human understanding, traffic (motor vehicle laws), and carrier enforcement.

The Training Academy staff is well-versed in educational theories such as state-to-state training and adult learning guidelines.  The recruits undergo nearly one thousand hours of instruction during camp.  The challenge is to ensure they are absorbing and retaining the information.  In accordance with the adult learning theory, classes run into the evening rather than starting too early in the morning and much of the instruction involves hands-on and scenario-based training.  State-to-state training means the staff tries to present the instruction in the same conditions and environments the recruits will actually experience on the street.

Weapons
 Glock Model 21SF .45 ACP (being replaced by Glock Model 45 Gen 5 9mm) 
 Smith & Wesson M&P15 5.56×45mm NATO
 Colt M4 Carbine 5.56×45mm NATO 
 CAR-15 "Commando" XM177 5.56×45mm NATO
 Remington 870 12 gauge

Prior to the Glock Model 21SF, troopers carried other Glock Model pistols one of which was the Glock Model 22 .40 S&W which had the Nebraska State Patrol logo and "NSP" etched into the slide of the pistol. The NSP authorized various Glock Models over the years including the Glock Model 20 10mm which featured the NSP logo engraved in the slide.

The Nebraska State Patrol utilizes numerous AR-15 styled rifle's for patrol as well as for the tactical team, some patrol rifles feature the EOTech Holographic Sight equipped on the rifle and have spare magazines attached to the rifle.

Currently the agency is training new recruits with the Glock Model 45 a 9mm handgun. The Glock Model 45 has the grip and capacity of a Glock 17 but has the slide of a Glock 19. The current troopers will transition to the new 9mm handguns from their current Glock 21SF .45 caliber sidearms which are 9 years old.

Vehicle fleet
 Dodge Charger
 Ford Expedition
 Ford Crown Victoria
 Ford Explorer
 Chevrolet Suburban
 Ford F-350
 Ford Taurus

Fallen officers
Since the creation of the Nebraska State Patrol, 12 officers have died in the line of duty.

See also

 List of law enforcement agencies in Nebraska
 State police
 State patrol
 Highway patrol

References

External links
Nebraska State Patrol - Official Website

Government agencies established in 1937
1937 establishments in Nebraska
State law enforcement agencies of Nebraska
Transportation in Nebraska
Nebraska law